Mart Dijkstra (born 10 August 1990) is a Dutch footballer who plays as a midfielder for Harkemase Boys.

Club career
He started his senior career with Harkemase Boys and then moved to SC Cambuur, whom he left in 2015 after four years with the club. In summer 2017, Dijkstra was snapped up by NEC. He returned to his first club Harkemase Boys in October 2020.

Honours

Club
SC Cambuur
Eerste Divisie: 2012–13

Sparta Rotterdam
 Eerste Divisie: 2015-16

References

External links
 
 Voetbal International profile 

1990 births
Living people
People from Delfzijl
Association football midfielders
Dutch footballers
SC Cambuur players
Sparta Rotterdam players
NEC Nijmegen players
Eredivisie players
Eerste Divisie players
Harkemase Boys players
Footballers from Groningen (province)